Giannis Masouras (born 24 August 1996) is a Greek professional footballer who plays as a right-back for Ekstraklasa club Miedź Legnica.

Career
Masouras started his career with his local Patras-based amateur club Atromitos. On 1 July 2013 he signed his first professional contract with Football League club Panachaiki. He remained at the team for two seasons mostly playing for the youth squad, making a total of 13 league appearances. He also competed successfully in the track and field team of Panachaiki as a runner. On 23 July 2015, he signed a three-year contract with AEL for an undisclosed fee. The 21-year-old player scored three goals (all in Greek Cup) in 29 official performances in all domestic competitions during 2017–18 season.

Olympiacos
On 28 June 2018, he signed with Olympiacos for a reported fee of €1 million. AEL would retain a 10% resale rate for any future sale of the player to exceed a €1 million fee.

On 27 September 2018, he made his debut with the club in a 1–0 win Greek Cup home game against Levadiakos.

On 4 February 2019, after Masouras was underutilized by manager Pedro Martins, he was allowed to join Panionios on loan for the remainder of the season. On 21 April 2019, Masouras opened the scoring in a 2–1 home win game against PAS Giannina. On the edge of the penalty area, the Olympiacos loanee thumped an unstoppable attempt into the top right corner to give Panionios the lead within seven minutes.

On 27 August 2019, his loan to Panionios was extended until the summer of 2020, but also rejoined AEL during the 2020–21 season.

On 26 August 2020, as Masouras was not in the plans of Olympiacos' coach Pedro Martins, he was sent on loan again, this time joining Ekstraklasa club Górnik Zabrze until the summer of 2021.
On 1 September 2021, Eredivisie club Sparta Rotterdam announced the agreement with Olympiakos for a long season loan.

Miedź Legnica
On 4 January 2023, he left Olympiacos permanently and returned to Poland, signing a year-and-a-half deal with Miedź Legnica.

Career statistics

Club

References

External links
 dete.gr
 patragoal.gr
 patrasevents.gr

1996 births
Living people
Footballers from Patras
Greek footballers
Association football fullbacks
Greece under-21 international footballers
Panachaiki F.C. players
Athlitiki Enosi Larissa F.C. players
Olympiacos F.C. players
Panionios F.C. players
Górnik Zabrze players
Sparta Rotterdam players
Miedź Legnica players
Football League (Greece) players
Super League Greece players
Ekstraklasa players
Eredivisie players
Greek expatriate footballers
Expatriate footballers in Poland
Expatriate footballers in the Netherlands
Greek expatriate sportspeople in Poland
Greek expatriate sportspeople in the Netherlands